ANDAM is a French fashion award established in 1989 by Nathalie Dufour as a joint venture between the French Ministry of Culture and the Defi Mode fashion organisation. It has been recognised as a benchmark for designers, fashion professionals, and members of the international press, and as a pathway for young designers hoping to enter the Paris Fashion Week.

The awards were originally restricted to Europeans living in France, but entry was extended to international candidates in 2005.

In 2011, a new First Collection Prize was introduced, providing a €60,000 grant to a French fashion company. In 2012, the value of the global awards was increased to €290,000, with a €60 000 L'Express Style prize being introduced.

In 2018, the value of the global awards reached €430 000 with four prizes: the Grand Prix, the Creative Brand Prize, the Accessories Prize, and the Innovation Prize for designers, entrepreneur or start-ups willing to develop an project in France. The Innovation Prize recognises creative, innovative and technological solutions in the field of fashion design, production and distribution to develop an accountable and transparent fashion, taking into account economic, environmental and social issues.

In the same year, Guillaume Houzé replaced Pierre Bergé as the president of the awards.

Notable events
 1989: Martin Margiela is the first winner.
 1994: Viktor & Rolf win the fellowship.
 1995: Christophe Lemaire wins the competition, going on to become artistic director for Hermès.
 1998: Jeremy Scott wins, going on to collaborate with Longchamp.
 2000: Lutz Huelle wins, going on to be Artistic Director for Jesús del Pozo and working for Max Mara and Brioni (brand) as well as being artistic director for his namesake brand.
 2003: Anne-Valérie Hash wins, going on to work with Galeries Lafayette.
 2005: ANDAM opens its competition to international candidates not residing in France allowing Bernhard Willhelm to win the prize. Felipe Oliveira Baptista, former artistic director for Lacoste, collaborates with LVMH and Beams (Japon).
 2007: Bruno Pieters is financed by Yves Saint Laurent and Fondation Pierre Bergé - Yves Saint Laurent.
 2008: ANDAM creates a single international award totaling €150,000. Gareth Pugh is the fellowship winner of this new edition. 
 2009: Creation of a second prize, the Young Fashion Designer Award, won by Ligia Diaz. Longchamp collaborate with Jeremy Scott, Bless and Charles Anastase, previous ANDAM winners. ANDAM celebrates its 20th anniversary.
 2010: ANDAM organizes its first “fashion dinner” hosted by the French Minister of Culture, rue de Valois, surrounded by the major actors of the contemporary fashion scene.
 2011: ANDAM awards Anthony Vaccarello with a €200,000 endowment, allowing him to create his French structure. The First Collection Award is introduced with Yiqing Yin winning a €60,000 endowment.
 2012: ANDAM awards Julien David with a €230,000 endowment and Pièce d'Anarchive with a €60,000 grant.
 2013: ANDAM awards Alexandre Mattiussi with a €250,000 endowment and Christine Phung with €75,000 and the First Collection Prize.
 2014: ANDAM awards Iris Van Herpen with a €250,000 endowment and Sébastien Meyer with €75,000 and the First Collection Prize
 2015: ANDAM awards Stéphane Ashpool with a €250,-00 endowment, the First Collection Prize Léa Peckre with €100,000 endowment and Accessories Prize Charlotte Chesnais with €50,000 endowment
 2016: ANDAM awards Wanda Nylon with a €250,000 endowment, the First Collection Prize Atlein with €100,000 endowment and Accessories Prize Tomasini Paris with €50,000 endowment
 2017: ANDAM awards Y/Project with a €250,000 endowment, AVOC with €100,000 First Collection Prize endowment, Ana Khouri with €50,000  Accessories Prize endowment and Euveka with €30,000  Innovation Prizeendowment
 2018: ANDAM awards Atlein with a €250,000 endowment, the First Collection Prize Ludovic de Saint Sernin with €100,000 endowment, Accessories Prize D’Heygère with €50,000 endowment and Innovation Prize Colorifix with €30,000 endowment

Fellowship winners

See also

 List of fashion awards

References

External links 
 

Fashion awards